Guy Cosmo (born 12 March 1977 in Port Jefferson, NY) is an American racing driver who competes in the United SportsCar Championship. He is a former American Le Mans Series Rookie-of-the-Year winner who claimed four wins and multiple podium finishes in ALMS competition.

Early racing career
Cosmo's career began in go-karts at the age of 11, earning championships in karting, Formula Ford, F2000 and Star Mazda prior to a limited season in Toyota Atlantic Championship competition.  He earned four top-10 finishes in four starts in Atlantics prior to being chosen as a development driver for the new Star Mazda Pro Formula Car.

Grand-Am
Cosmo made his Rolex Sports Car Series and Continental Tire Sports Car Challenge debuts in 2003, scoring three podium finishes in five starts with Cegwa Sport and G&W Motorsports. He earned two victories in two starts in the CTSC STI class in 2003.

In 2006, Cosmo competed in a limited-season with Playboy/Uniden Racing and Spirit of Daytona Racing, earning a season-high second-place result at Miller Motorsports Park and helping take Playboy/Uniden Racing to a fourth-place finish in the DP points standings.

The 2007 season saw Cosmo compete for a variety of teams, including Doran Racing, Blackforest Motorsports, Brumos Racing, Southard Motorports and Spirit of Daytona Racing, while also enjoying success in CTSC with one victory and two podium finishes in Fountain Motorsports' BMW 330i.

Cosmo competed in the majority of the 2008 and 2009 seasons with Spirit of Daytona Racing, as part of the team's development program with its Lozano Brothers-tuned Porsche Cayenne V8 engine.

He rejoined BGB Motorsports in 2008 and raced with the team in CTSC competition through 2011, before making several Rolex Series starts in Extreme Speed Motorsports' Ferrari 458 Italia Grand Am in 2012.

American Le Mans Series
Cosmo made his ALMS debut in 2003 with a 9th-place finish at the 12 Hours of Sebring in American Spirit Racing's Riley & Scott MKIIIC.

In 2005, he earned Rookie-of-the-Year honors after completing his first full season, which included one LMP2 class victory and eight podium finishes in the B-K Motorsports Courage C65 Mazda.

He again finished third in the LMP2 championship in 2006 in the factory B-K Mazda program, prior to joining Orbit Racing for its GTC campaign in 2009. Cosmo earned three class poles, one race win and two additional podiums in the team's Porsche 911 GT3 Cup car.

Cosmo joined Extreme Speed Motorsports in 2010 as part of its Ferrari GT program, which saw him paired with Patron Spirits CEO Ed Brown from 2010-12.

In 2013, Cosmo and the ESM team switched to the LMP2 class with Honda Performance Development ARX-03b cars, where he teamed with Scott Sharp for the opening six rounds, earning a win at Long Beach.

On August 26, 2013, it was announced that Cosmo had left ESM for Level 5 Motorsports. He won in his team debut with Level 5 at Baltimore, prior to additional podium finishes that season.

In all, Cosmo enjoyed his most successful ALMS season to date in 2013, finishing third in the championship with two wins and nine podium finishes between the two teams.

United SportsCar Championship
Cosmo finished sixth in GTD in the season-opening Rolex 24 at Daytona in the No. 556 Level 5 Motorsports Ferrari 458 Italia GT3 with co-drivers Scott Tucker, Terry Borcheller, Mike LaMarra and Milo Valverde.

Other accomplishments
Cosmo was the overall winner of the 25 Hours of Thunderhill in 2010 in a Mercer Motorsports Porsche 911 GT3 Cup car. He test drove a Ferrari Formula 1 car at Mazda Raceway Laguna Seca in 2012.

Complete motorsports results

SCCA National Championship Runoffs

American Open-Wheel racing results
(key) (Races in bold indicate pole position, races in italics indicate fastest race lap)

USF2000 National Championship

Atlantic Championship

Barber Dodge Pro Series

Complete IMSA SportsCar Championship results
(key)(Races in bold indicate pole position, Results are overall/class)

References

External links

1977 births
Living people
People from Long Island
Rolex Sports Car Series drivers
24 Hours of Daytona drivers
American Le Mans Series drivers
Barber Pro Series drivers
WeatherTech SportsCar Championship drivers
American racing drivers
SCCA National Championship Runoffs participants
U.S. F2000 National Championship drivers
Indy Pro 2000 Championship drivers
GT World Challenge America drivers
Extreme Speed Motorsports drivers
Level 5 Motorsports drivers
United Autosports drivers
Asian Le Mans Series drivers
Jota Sport drivers
Michelin Pilot Challenge drivers